La demoiselle et son revenant is a 1952 French film directed by Marc Allégret and written by Roger Vadim.

Plot

Cast 
 Robert Dhéry as Jules Petitpas
 Annick Morice as Rosette
 Félix Oudart as Pompignan de Beauminet
 Catherine Fonteney as Hortense de Beauminet
 Henri Vilbert as Ledru
 Jean Richard as Ricard
 Kieron Moore as l'Américain
 Roland Armontel as le pharmacien
 Jacqueline Huet as Mathilde
 Germaine Grainval as Berthe
 Amena Ilami as Virginie
 Jacky Gencel as Marcelin
 Marcelle Hainia as la grand-mère
 Maurice Schutz as le doyen
 Jacques de Féraudy as l'académicien
 Jacques Legras as le duelliste
 Christian Marquand as le zouave

External links

1952 films
Films scored by Gérard Calvi
French black-and-white films
1950s French-language films
1950s French films